International aid has been provided to Palestinians since at least the 1948 Arab–Israeli War. The Palestinians view the aid as keeping the Israeli–Palestinian peace process going, while the Israelis claim that it is used to fund terrorism and removes the imperative to Palestinians to negotiate a settlement of the Israel-Palestinian conflict. The Palestinian National Authority (PA), within the West Bank and Gaza Strip, receives one of the highest levels of aid in the world. Aid has been provided to the Palestinian Authority, Palestinian non-governmental organizations (PNGOs) as well as Palestinian political factions by various foreign governments, international organisations, international non-governmental organizations (INGOs), and charities, besides other sources.

The Ad Hoc Liaison Committee coordinates the delivery of most aid to Palestinians. The entities that provide such aid are categorized into seven groups: the Arab nations, the European Union, the United States, Japan, international institutions (including agencies of the UN system), European countries, and other nations. In July 2018, Australia ceased providing direct aid to the PA, saying the donations could increase the PA's capacity to pay Palestinians convicted of politically motivated violence, and that it will direct its funds through United Nations programs.

UNRWA

The United Nations Relief and Works Agency for Palestine Refugees in the Near East (UNRWA) was set up in 1949 to provide humanitarian relief to Palestinians displaced by the 1948 Arab–Israeli War. Originally, it was intended to provide jobs on public works projects and direct relief. Today, UNRWA provides education, health care, and social services to more than 5 million registered Palestinian refugees and their descendants, and other segments of Palestinian society, as well as providing some financial aid to Palestinians. UNRWA has also been a donor to the PA. UNRWA employs over 30,000 staff, 99% of whom are locally recruited Palestinians. Most of UNRWA's funding comes from European countries and the United States. Between 2000 and 2015 the European Union contributed €1.6 billion to UNRWA. In addition to its regular budget, UNRWA receives funding for emergency activities and special projects.

In 2009, UNRWA's total budget was US$1.2 billion, of which it received US$948 million. In 2009, the retiring Commissioner General spoke of a $200 million shortfall in UNRWA's budgets. Officials in 2009 spoke of a 'dire financial crisis'.

In 2010, the biggest contributors to its regular budget were the United States and the European Commission with $248 million and $165 million respectively. Sweden ($47m), the United Kingdom ($45m), Norway ($40m), and the Netherlands ($29m) were also important donors.

In 2011, the US was the largest single contributor with a total contribution of over $239 million, followed by the European Commission's $175 million contribution.

According to World Bank data, for all countries receiving more than $2 billion international aid in 2012, Gaza and the West Bank received a per capita aid budget over double the next largest recipient, at a rate of $495.

In 2013, $1.1 billion was contributed to UNRWA, of which $294 million was contributed by the United States, $216.4 million by the EU, $151.6 million by Saudi Arabia, $93.7 million by Sweden, $54.4 million by Germany, $53 million by Norway, $34.6 million by Japan, $28.8 million by Switzerland, $23.3 million by Australia, $22.4 million by the Netherlands, $20 million by Denmark, $18.6 million by Kuwait, $17 million by France, $12.3 million by Italy, $10.7 million by Belgium as well as $10.3 million by all other countries.

In 2016, the US contributed $368 million to UNWRA, and $350 million in 2017, but has cut around one third of its contributions for 2018. In January 2018, the US withheld $65 million, roughly half the amount due in the month, again creating a financial crisis for UNRWA. Belgium and the Netherlands announced a plan to increase their contributions to UNRWA. In August 2018, the US cut its annual contribution of $360m to UNWRA, citing many complaints, including the number of Palestinians UNWRA recognizes as refugees, which number more than 5 million. In mid-2019, Netherlands, Belgium and Switzerland temporarily suspended funding to UNRWA. In December 2019, the Netherlands restored funding to UNWRA, increasing its donation by €6 million for 2019, to €19 million.

In April 2021, the US contributed $150m to UNRWA, on condition that the funds are not used to assist any refugee receiving military training or has participated in any terrorist act.

History

Before Oslo Accords
Before the signing of the Oslo Accords, international aid for the West Bank and Gaza came mainly from Western and Arab states, mostly through UN agencies such as UNRWA. Most programs were started or developed during the 1970s, and expanded during the 1980s. Most of the aid was channeled through PNGOs or INGOs. Although the stance of the donors during the pre-Oslo period is regarded by some analysts, such as Rex Brynen, as controversial and linked with phenomena such as corruption, nationalism and factional rivalries, international aid effectively financed  a series of programs in the sectors of agriculture, infrastructure, housing and education.

Oslo Accords
The Oslo Accords, officially signed on September 13, 1993, contained substantial provisions on economic matters and international aid: Annex IV of the Declaration of Principles (DoP) discusses regional cooperation and implicitly calls for major international aid efforts to help the Palestinians, Jordan, Israel and the entire region.

On October 1, 1993, the international donor community (nations and institutions) met in Washington to mobilize support for the peace process, and pledged to provide approximately $2.4 billion to the Palestinians over the course of the next five years. The international community's action was based on the premise that it was imperative to garner all financial resources needed to make the agreement successful, and with a full understanding that in order for the Accords to stand in the face of daily challenges on the ground, ordinary Palestinians needed to perceive positive change in their lives. Therefore, the donors had two major goals: to fuel Palestinian economic growth and to build public
support for negotiations with Israel. According to Scott Lasensky, "throughout the follow-up talks to the DoP that produced the Gaza-Jericho Agreement (May 1994), the Early Empowerment Agreement (August 1994), the Interim Agreement (September 1995), and the Hebron Accord (January 1997), [...] economic aid hovered over the process and remained the single most critical external component buttressing the PNA."

1993–2000
Between 1993 and 1997 the PNA faced serious economic and financial problems. International aid prevented the collapse of the local economy, and contributed to the establishment of the Palestinian administration. Donors' pledges continued to increase regularly (their value had risen to approximately $3,420 million as of the end of October 1997) as a result of the faltering peace process, along with the increase in needs and the consequent increase in the assistance necessary for Palestinians to survive. Reality led, however, to a revision of the donors' priorities: Out of concern that the deteriorating economic conditions could result in a derailment of the peace process, donor support was redirected to finance continued budgetary shortfalls, housing programs and emergency employment creation. According to a more critical approach, international aid in the mid-1990s supported PNA's bureaucracy and belatedly promoted the centralization of political power, but in a way that did not enhance government capacity and harmed the PNGOs. In 1994–1995 problems of underfunding, inefficiency and poor aid coordination marked donors' activity, and led to tensions among the different aid bodies, and between the international community and the PNA. In 1996, the link between development assistance and the success of the peace process was made explicit by the President of the World Bank, James Wolfensohn, who stated: "The sense of urgency is clear. Peace will only be assured in that area if you can get jobs for those people."

After 1997, there was a reduction in the use of closure policy by Israel, which led to an employment growth and an expansion of the West Bank and Gaza economy. After the signing of the Wye River Memorandum, a new donors' conference was convened, and over $2 billion was pledged to the PNA for 1999–2003. Nevertheless, overall donor disbursements fell in 1998–2000, and the 1998 disbursements=to-commitments ratio was the lowest since 1994. As for international institutions, they began to play a bigger role in the international funding process, in spite of the decline in the absolute value of these institutions' total commitments. After 1997, the need for donor support for the current budget and employment generation programs receded due to the PA's improved fiscal performance, and attention was focused instead on infrastructures to the detriment of institution building. Donors' activity was also characterized by a decline in support for PNGOs, and by a preference to concessionary loans (instead of grants) with generous grace periods, long repayment periods and low interest rates

2000–06
The second Intifada led to one of the deepest recessions the Palestinian economy
experienced in modern history. In those two years, Palestinian real
GDP per capita shrunk by almost 40 percent. The precipitator of this economic crisis was again a multi-faceted system of restrictions on the movement of goods and people designed to protect Israelis in Israel itself and in the settlements.

One of the many frustrations of the crisis was the erosion of the development effort financed by the international community, since the overwhelming emphasis in donor work was now directed towards mitigating the impact of the economic and social crisis. A collapse of the PNA was averted by emergency budget support from donor countries. Despite a significant increase in donor commitments in 2002 compared with 2001, commitments to infrastructure and capacity-building work with a medium-term focus continued to decline. In 2000, the ratio was approximately 7:1 in
favor of development assistance. By 2002, the ratio had shifted to almost 5:1 in favor of
emergency assistance.

Yasser Arafat's death in 2004 and Israel's unilateral disengagement from Gaza created new hopes to the donor community. In March 2005, the Quartet on the Middle East underscored the importance of development assistance, and urged the international donors community to support Palestinian institution building, without however ignoring budgetary support. The Quartet also urged Israel and the PNA to fulfill their commitments arising from the Road map for peace, and the international community "to review and energize current donor coordination structures [...] in order to increase their effectiveness." The international community's attempt in late 2005 to promote Palestinian economic recovery reflected a long-standing assumption that economic development is crucial to the peace process and to prevent backsliding into conflict. Although a mild positive growth returned in 2003 and 2005, this fragile recovery stalled as a result of the segmentation of the Gaza Strip, the stiff restrictions on movements of goods and people across the borders with Israel and Egypt, and the completion of the Israeli West Bank barrier. As the World Bank stressed in December 2005, "growth will not persist without good Palestinian governance, sound economic management and a continued relaxation of closure by GOI."

2006–07
On 25 January 2006, the Islamist organization, Hamas, which is considered by the main donor countries to be a terrorist organization, won the Palestinian legislative elections and formed government on 29 March 2006, without accepting the terms and conditions set by the Quartet. This resulted in the imposition of economic sanctions against the PA, including near cessation of direct relations and aid between most bilateral donors and the PA, with only some multilateral agencies and a few donors continuing direct contact and project administration. The Quartet's decision was criticised by the Quartet's former envoy, James Wolfensohn, who characterized it "a misguided attempt to starve the Hamas-led Palestinians into submission," and of UN's Middle East former envoy, Alvaro de Soto.

Because of the worsening humanitarian crisis, the EU proposed a plan to channel aid directly to the Palestinians, bypassing the Hamas-led government. The Quartet approved the EU proposal, despite an initial US objection, and the EU set up a "temporary international mechanism" (TIM) to channel funds through the Palestinian President for an initial period of three months, which was later extended. Oxfam was one of the main critics of the EU TIM program arguing that "limited direct payments from the European Commission have failed to address this growing crisis."

The emergence of two rival governments in the West Bank and the Gaza Strip in June 2007 presented the international community with the prospect of shouldering a huge aid burden. The World Bank estimated that in 2008 the PNA would need $1.2 billion in recurrent budget support, in addition to $300 million in development aid. The formation of the emergency government in mid-2007 in the West Bank led by Salam Fayyad, led to the resumption of aid to the West Bank PA government which partly reversed the impact of the aid boycott. Nevertheless, economic indicators have not changed considerably. For instance, because of the situation in Gaza, real GDP growth was estimated to be about -0.5% in 2007, and 0.8% in 2008.

According to the Development Assistance Committee, the main multilateral donors for the 2006–2007 period were UNRWA and the EU (through the European Commission), while the main bilateral donors were the US, Japan, Canada and five European countries (Norway, Germany, Sweden, Spain and France).

2007–09

In December 2007, during the Paris Conference, which followed the Annapolis Conference, donor countries pledged over $7.7 billion for 2008–2010 in support of the Palestinian Reform and Development Program (PRDP). Hamas, which was not invited to Paris, called the conference a "declaration of war" on it. In the beginning of 2008, the EU moved from the TIM mechanism to PEGASE, which provided channels for direct support to the PA's Central Treasury Account in addition to the types of channels used for TIM. The World Bank also launched a trust fund that would provide support in the context of the PA's 2008–2010 reform policy agenda. However, neither mechanism contained sufficient resources to cover the PA's entire monthly needs, thus not allowing the PA to plan expenditures beyond a two-month horizon.

The World Bank assesses that the PA had made significant progress on implementing the reform agenda laid out in the PRDP, and re-establishing law and order. Gaza, however, remained outside the reforms as Hamas controls security and the most important ministry positions there. Palestinian inter-factional tension continued in the West Bank and Gaza, with arrests of people and closures of NGOs by each side, resulting in a deterioration in the ability of civil society organizations to continue to cater to vulnerable groups. Following the 2008–2009 Israel–Gaza conflict, an international conference took place in Sharm El-Sheikh, Egypt, where donors pledged almost $4.5 billion for the reconstruction of Gaza. These funds bypassed Hamas, since the PA in collaboration with the donor community has taken the lead in delivering and distributing the assistance. India which is aspiring to be recognized as 'globally respected power' has made concerted efforts in fostering better relations with the PA. When PA President Abbas visited New Delhi in 2008 he was offered a credit of US$20 million (Rs.900 million) by the Indian government. India also continued to offer eight scholarships under ICCR Schemes to Palestinian students for higher studies in India, while also offering several slots for training courses under the ITEC Program.

According to estimates made by the World Bank, the PA received $1.8 billion of international aid in 2008 and $1.4 billion in 2009.

2010
In 2010, the lion's share of the aid came from the European Union and the United States. According to estimates made by the World Bank, the PA received $525 million of international aid in the first half of 2010.  Foreign aid is the "main driver" of economic growth in the Palestinian territories. According to the International Monetary Fund, the unemployment rate  has fallen as the economy of Gaza grew by 16% in the first half of 2010, almost twice as fast as the economy of the West Bank.<ref name=Economistgaza>[Hamas and the Peace Talks,"] The Economist, September 25, 2010, p. 59.</ref>

In July 2010, Germany outlawed a major Turkish-German donor group, the Internationale Humanitaere Hilfsorganisation (IHH) (unaffiliated to the Turkish İnsani Yardım Vakfı (İHH)) that sent the Mavi Mamara aid vessel, saying it had used donations to support projects in Gaza that are related to Hamas, which is considered by the European Union to be a terrorist organization, while presenting their activities to donors as humanitarian help. German Interior Minister Thomas de Maiziere said, "Donations to so-called social welfare groups belonging to Hamas, such as the millions given by IHH, actually support the terror organization Hamas as a whole."

2011
In March 2011, there were threats to cut off aid to the PA if it continued to move forward on a unity government with Hamas, unless Hamas formally renounced violence, recognized Israel, and accepted previous Israel-Palestinian agreements.  Azzam Ahmed, spokesman for PA President Abbas, responded by stating that the PA was willing to give up financial aid in order to achieve unity, "Palestinians need American money, but if they use it as a way of pressuring us, we are ready to relinquish that aid."

2014
In October 2014, the Cairo Conference on Palestine, an international donor conference on reconstructing the Gaza Strip, garnered $5.4 billion in pledges, of which $1 billion was pledged by Qatar. Half of the pledges were to be used for rebuilding efforts in Gaza, while the remainder was to support the PA budget until 2017.

2018
On 23 March 2018, U.S. President Donald Trump signed the Taylor Force Act into law, which will cut about a third of US foreign aid payments to the PA, until the PA ceases making payment of stipends to terrorists and their surviving families.

In July 2018, Australia stopped the A$10M (US$7.5M) in funding that had been sent to the PA via the World Bank, and instead is sending it to the UN Humanitarian Fund for the Palestinian Territories. The reason given was that they did not want the PA to use the funds to assist Palestinians convicted of politically motivated violence.

On 24 August, the United States cut more than $200 million in direct aid to the PA. The administration had previously cut aid to several UN bodies devoted to the Palestinian cause, including cutting $300 million off the contribution to United Nations Relief and Works Agency (UNRWA), and the UN Human Rights Council.

2019
In February 2019, the US stopped all USAID to Palestinians in the West Bank and Gaza. The US stopped providing more than $60m in annual funds for the Palestinian security services at the request of the PA because of a fear of lawsuits following the enactment of the Anti-Terrorism Clarification Act of 2018 (ATCA), which came into force in February 2019, and allows Americans to sue in US courts those receiving US foreign aid over alleged complicity in "acts of war". The stopping of funding for security services has raised some concerns.

In November 2019, the Netherlands cut the US$1.5 million per annum it paid directly to the Palestinian Authority over payments it makes to families of militants killed, hurt, or imprisoned by Israel (described by Israel as salaries to terrorists).

Blockade of the Gaza Strip

In 2007, Israel, the Quartet on the Middle East (comprising the United Nations, the United States, the European Union, and Russia) and other countries ceased providing aid to the PA Hamas-led government that refused to accept the conditions set by them, and imposed sanctions against the PA. After Hamas took control of the Gaza Strip and a non-Hamas government installed in the West Bank, the sanctions against the PA administered West Bank were withdrawn and donations resumed. Israel and Egypt imposed a land, air, and sea blockade of the Gaza Strip, which is ongoing. The PA administration imposed its own sanctions against the Hamas-ruled Gaza Strip. 

Since 2014, with Israel's approval despite the blockade, Qatar has provided aid to the Gaza Strip that has partially relieved some of the economic pressure on the Gaza Strip. Between 2014 and 2019, Qatar has provided over $1 billion in reconstruction funds and stipends for poor Palestinians.

Major donors

Since 1993 the European Commission and the EU member-states combined have been by far the largest aid contributor to the Palestinians.

Arab League states have also been substantial donors, notably through budgetary support of the PNA during the Second Intifada. However, they have been criticized for not sufficiently financing the UNRWA and the PNA, and for balking at their pledges. After the 2006 Palestinian elections, the Arab countries tried to contribute to the payment of wages for Palestinian public servants, bypassing the PNA. At the same time Arab funds were paid directly to Abbas' office for disbursement.

During the Paris Conference, 11% of the pledges came from the US and Canada, 53% from Europe and 20% from Arab countries.

Donor coordination
The Ad Hoc Liaison Committee (AHLC) was established in November 1993 to coordinate donor donations and in an effort to balance competing United States and European positions, to facilitate agenda-setting, reduce duplication, and foster synergies. The AHLC operates on the basis of consensus, and aims at promoting dialogue between the partners of the "triangular partnership", namely the donors, Israel and the Palestinian Authority.

 Human rights organizations concerns 
In June 2016, the Euro-Mediterranean Human Rights Monitor released a report, titled Squandered Aid: Israel's repetitive destruction of EU-funded projects in Palestine'', discussing Israel’s repeated destruction of EU-funded projects in the Palestinian territories. The report claimed that, since 2001, Israel had destroyed around 150 development projects, which incurs the EU a financial loss of approximately €58 million. The report estimated the total value of EU squandered aid money, including development and humanitarian projects, amounted to €65million, of which at least €23million was lost during the 2014 Israel–Gaza conflict alone. The Monitor called for an investigation on all destroyed structures built with funding from the UN, EU or member states on Palestinian land. In addition, the Monitor recommended continued investing in Palestinian development, but substantively penalize the Israeli government when UN- or European-funded projects are targeted.

See also
Ad Hoc Liaison Committee
Saudi foreign assistance
United States foreign aid
United States security assistance to the Palestinian National Authority

References

References

External links
 Report to Congress on US aid the Palestine

Economy of the State of Palestine
Palestine
Humanitarian aid
Palestinian politics
Foreign relations of the State of Palestine 
Israeli–Palestinian conflict and the United Nations